Islamic civilization may refer to:

Islamic Golden Age
Reception of Islam in Early Modern Europe
Muslim world
Caliphate
Islamic culture

See also 

 History of Islam